World Para Snowboard Championships, was played first time at 2015.

Locations

Medal table

Medalists

Men's events
Snowboard cross SB-LL1

Snowboard cross SB-LL2

Snowboard cross SB-UL

Banked slalom SB-LL1

Banked slalom SB-LL2

Banked slalom SB-UL

Women's events
Snowboard cross SB-LL1

Snowboard cross SB-LL2

Snowboard cross SB-UL

Banked slalom SB-LL1

Banked slalom SB-LL2

Banked slalom SB-UL

See also

Para-snowboarding classification
Snowboarding at the Winter Paralympics

Sources

 https://www.paralympic.org/bigwhite-2017
 https://www.paralympic.org/bigwhite-2017/schedule-results/info-live-results/sbwj17/eng/zz/engzz_snowboard-medal-count.htm
 https://www.paralympic.org/sdms/web/calendar/sb/season/W15
 https://www.paralympic.org/bigwhite-2017
 https://www.paralympic.org/news/big-white-host-2017-world-para-snowboard-championships
 https://www.paralympic.org/snowboard/history
 https://www.paralympic.org/snowboard/2017-2018-world-cup
 https://www.paralympic.org/snowboard/calendar-results
 https://www.paralympic.org/snowboard/2017-2018-world-cup
 https://www.paralympic.org/snowboard/calendar-results

External links

Snowboard
Snowboarding competitions